Chmielniki  is a village in the administrative district of Gmina Suchowola, within Sokółka County, Podlaskie Voivodeship, in north-eastern Poland.

The village has a population of 110.

References

Chmielniki